The 10th Sarasaviya Awards festival (Sinhala: 10වැනි සරසවිය සම්මාන උලෙළ), presented by the Associated Newspapers of Ceylon Limited, was held to honor the best films of 1981 Sinhala cinema on May 29, 1982, at the Bandaranaike Memorial International Conference Hall, Colombo 07, Sri Lanka. Minister of Finance and Planning Ronnie de Mel was the chief guest at the awards night.

The film Sagarayak Meda won the most awards with eight including Best Film.

Awards

References

Sarasaviya Awards
Sarasaviya